Cheval Grand (in Japanese: シュヴァルグラン) (foaled March 14, 2012) is a Japanese Thoroughbred racehorse who won the 2016 Copa Republica Argentina and the 2017 Japan Cup.

His dam, is also the dam of Verxina and Vivlos, also of which are owned by Kazuhiro Sasaki.

Career

Cheval Grand's first race was on September 21, 2014, where he finished in 2nd place.

On October 3, 2015, in the Special Weight category, he won his first at Hanshin Racecourse. Another win at Hanshin followed soon after as he won the Orion Stakes on December 13, 2015.

On November 6, 2016, Cheval won the Copa Republica Argentina.

Grand's first major win was on November 26, 2017,  as he won the 2017 Japan Cup.

On April 29, 2018, Cheval came in 2nd place at the Spring Tenno Sho behind Rainbow Line.

On March 30, 2019, Cheval came in 2nd place behind Old Persian at the Dubai Sheema Classic. Cheval went on to race in 2 British races, the King George VI and Queen Elizabeth Stakes and the International Stakes, that year, neither of which were successful. Cheval Grand retired after returning to Japan and racing in both the Japan Cup and the Arima Kinen, the latter in which he finished in 6th place behind Lys Gracieux but passing Almond Eye.

After retiring from racing, Cheval Grand is standing stud at the Breeders Stallion Station.

Career earnings

Cheval Grand has earned a total of $10,190,341, averaging $308,798 per start.

Pedigree

Cheval Grand was inbred 3 × 4 to Halo, meaning that this stallion appeared in both the third and fourth generations of his pedigree.

References

2013 racehorse births
Japan Cup winners
Racehorses bred in Japan
Racehorses trained in Japan
Thoroughbred family 12-c